Four Plus Four is a 1987 Indian Malayalam film, directed by Jacob Breeze.  The film had musical score by Guna Singh.

Cast

Soundtrack
The music was composed by Guna Singh and lyrics was written by Poovachal Khader.

References

External links
 

1987 films
1980s Malayalam-language films